Afchi (also Romanized as Afchī; also known as Afjī) is a village in Aslan Duz Rural District, Aslan Duz District, Parsabad County, Ardabil Province, Iran. At the 2006 census, its population was 233, in 35 families.

References 

Towns and villages in Parsabad County